This is a list of Texas State Bobcats football players in the NFL and AFL Drafts.

Key

Selections

References

Texas State

Texas State Bobcats NFL Draft